Neya is the name of several inhabited localities in Kostroma Oblast, Russia.

Urban localities
Neya (town), a town; 

Rural localities
Neya (rural locality), a settlement in Khmelevskoye Settlement of Ponazyrevsky District;